Robert Arthur Whitcher (April 29, 1917 – May 8, 1997) was a Major League Baseball pitcher who appeared in nine games for the Boston Braves in 1945. The ,  left-hander was a native of Berlin, New Hampshire.

Whitcher is one of many ballplayers who only appeared in the major leagues during World War II. He made his major league debut in relief on August 20, 1945 against the St. Louis Cardinals at Braves Field. He started three games for Boston, and though he pitched effectively overall, the sixth-place Braves lost all three. The scores were 4–3 (10), 2–0, and 6–2.

Whitcher's season and career totals for 9 games are a 0–2 record, 3 starts, 0 complete games, and 3 games finished. Whitcher also appeared in three games as a pinch-runner. In 15 innings pitched he gave up 5 earned runs, giving him an ERA of 2.87.

Whitcher died at the age of 80 in Akron, Ohio.

References

External links
, or Retrosheet

1917 births
1997 deaths
Baseball players from New Hampshire
Boston Braves players
Evansville Braves players
Hartford Chiefs players
Major League Baseball pitchers
Pawtucket Slaters players
Saginaw Bears players